= Tulanana Bohela =

Tanzanian journalist and filmmaker

- Education: USIU - Kenya 2006-2009
- Occupation(s): Tanzanian Entrepreneur, journalist and filmmaker

Tulanana Bohela is a Tanzanian entrepreneur, journalist and filmmaker. Her career spans close to 10 years, reporting in Tanzania and the East African region on TV, radio and digital for BBC Africa and BBC Swahili. She became the digital lead in Tanzania for the BBC World Service.

== Career ==
Tulanana is a journalist, filmmaker, co-founder of Ona Stories digital content producer, news media reporter, and immersive media producer. Bohela worked with digital content production and African storytelling. She used media to improve the development of African societies, specifically in technology, business and social enterprises. Tulanana is a conference speaker, often addressing technology. She advocated banning early marriage in Africa by highlighting problems related to the practice.

Earlier in her career she co-founded Snap Productions and produced two season of 'Mgahawa' on East African Television

Bohela is a virtual reality producer. Most of her work concerns mobile technology and how it changes the way digital contents are created and shared in Africa.

== Recognition ==
In 2017 Tulanana's OnaStories won the #innovateAFRICA 2017 for the hub's exploration of the intersection of mobile-first content and digital video. She held the first virtual reality (VR) showcase event during Human Innovation Fund Week, which was supported by Kenyan VR production house, Black Rhino. Her first 360 piece, ‘What Could You Do", along with another piece ‘White Melanin’ was showcased at the Sheffield International Documentary festival.

In 2020, Tulanana's OnaStories won and became part of the Aga Khan Media Futures Innovation cohort of 2020/21

- Ousmane Sembene Award (nominated) Uthando
- Best Director for Uthando at the South African School for Motion Picture and Live Performance, AFDA, in Johannesburg.
